"Rain Fall Down" is a song from the Rolling Stones' 2005 album, A Bigger Bang. It was released on 5 December 2005 as the second single from the album, reaching number 33 in the UK Singles Chart, and currently remains their latest top 40 hit in the UK. The single also reached number 21 on Billboards Hot Dance Club Play chart in February 2006.

Track listings
 7-inch, CD (VS1907; VSCDX1907)
 "Rain Fall Down" – 4:54
 "Rain Fall Down" (will.i.am Remix)
 "Rain Fall Down" (Ashley Beedle's 'Heavy Disco' Vocal Re-Edit)

 Dutch CD (VSCDX1907 0094634858021)
 "Rain Fall Down" (will.i.am Remix) – 4:04
 "Rain Fall Down" (Radio Edit) – 4:00
 "Rain Fall Down" (Ashley Beedle's 'Heavy Disco' Radio Edit) – 4:04

 12-inch (VST1907)
 "Rain Fall Down" (will.i.am Remix)
 "Rain Fall Down" (Ashley Beedle's 'Heavy Disco' Vocal Re-Edit)

Personnel
 Mick Jagger - lead vocals, rhythm guitar;
 Keith Richards - rhythm guitar;
 Ronnie Wood - lead guitar;
 Charlie Watts - drums;

Additional personnel
 Darryl Jones - bass guitar;
 Chuck Leavell - keyboards;
 Lisa Fischer and Bernard Fowler - backing vocals;

Charts

References

The Rolling Stones songs
2005 singles
2005 songs
Music videos directed by Jonas Åkerlund
Song recordings produced by Don Was
Songs written by Jagger–Richards